Eric Phillip Muntz (May 18, 1934 – August 1, 2017) was a prominent American scientist  and a former Canadian football player who played for the Calgary Stampeders in 1956 and Toronto Argonauts from 1957 to 1960.  He previously played at the University of Toronto
where he received a B.S. degree in Aeronautical Engineering in 1956 and a PhD in 1961 specializing in Aerophysics. 

Since 1969, Muntz was a professor at University of Southern California Phil Muntz made important contributions to the development of electron beam fluorescence technique as well as its applications for high-speed flow measurements. He was an inventor on over 25 patents. 

In 1993, Muntz was elected a member of US National Academy of Engineering with the citation "For technical and academic leadership in rarified-gas dynamics and non-equilibrium flow phenomena".

In late 1990s and early 2000s, Muntz introduced and developed the concept of Knudsen compressor, a multi-stage vacuum pump with no moving parts or fluids. He died on August 1, 2017.

References

1934 births
2017 deaths
Aerospace engineers
Calgary Stampeders players
Canadian football running backs
Members of the United States National Academy of Engineering
Players of Canadian football from Ontario
Sportspeople from Hamilton, Ontario
Toronto Varsity Blues football players
Toronto Argonauts players
University of Southern California faculty